The  is a Landmark of Independent Baptist denominational body in Japan, related to the American Baptist Association. Its origins go back to 1952, when Eugene M. Reagan from Texas began missionary activity.

References

Baptist denominations in Asia
Baptist Christianity in Japan
Independent Baptist denominations